Melkhas (also Romanized as Melkhāş and Melkhās) is a village in Dodangeh Rural District, Hurand District, Ahar County, East Azerbaijan Province, Iran. At the 2006 census, its population was 62, in 11 families.

References 

Populated places in Ahar County